Leiva is a village in the province and autonomous community of La Rioja, Spain.

Places of interest

 Castle of Leiva

Notable people 
 Antonio de Leyva, Duke of Terranova
 Jesús Miguel Alonso Chavarri. Writer.

References

Populated places in La Rioja (Spain)